Mastixia trichotoma is a tree in the family Nyssaceae. The specific epithet  is from the Greek meaning "three parts", referring to the three-branched inflorescence.

Description
The smooth to fissured bark is yellowish grey to grey-brown. The flowers are green to yellowish green.

Distribution and habitat
Mastixia trichotoma grows naturally in the Andaman and Nicobar Islands, Thailand, Sumatra, Peninsular Malaysia, Java, Borneo, Sulawesi, the Moluccas and Mindanao. Its habitat is mixed dipterocarp forests from sea-level to  altitude.

References

trichotoma
Flora of the Andaman Islands
Flora of the Nicobar Islands
Trees of Thailand
Trees of Malesia
Taxa named by Carl Ludwig Blume
Plants described in 1826